The 1940 All-Ireland Junior Hurling Championship was the 23rd staging of the All-Ireland Junior Championship since its establishment by the Gaelic Athletic Association in 1912.

Galway entered the championship as the defending champions.

The All-Ireland final was played on 25 August 1940 at the Gaelic Grounds in Limerick, between Cork and Galway, in what was their first ever meeting in the final. Cork won the match by 3–03 to 2–01 to claim their fourth championship title overall and a first title since 1925.

Results

All-Ireland Junior Hurling Championship

All-Ireland semi-finals

All-Ireland final

References

Junior
All-Ireland Junior Hurling Championship